Susan Leo (born 10 August 1962) is a retired professional tennis player from Australia. She competed in the Fed Cup a number of times, from 1980 to 1983.

Leo won the singles title at the Queensland Open in 1976 and at the Western Australian Open in 1980. She reached the quarterfinals in doubles at Wimbledon in 1981 and 1982.

References

External links
  
 
 

1962 births
Living people
Australian female tennis players
Tennis people from Queensland
20th-century Australian women
21st-century Australian women